Béla Sárosi (15 May 1919 – 15 June 1993) was a Hungarian football player and manager.

He played for Ferencváros, Bologna, Bari, Junior Barranquilla, Porto, Real Zaragoza, Lugano and Millonarios FC. He gained 25 caps for Hungary.

He managed Lugano, FC Basel, Jahn Regensburg, Alemannia Aachen and Beerschot.

References

1919 births
1993 deaths
Association football midfielders
Hungarian footballers
Hungary international footballers
1938 FIFA World Cup players
Nemzeti Bajnokság I players
Serie A players
Categoría Primera A players
La Liga players
Primeira Liga players
Ferencvárosi TC footballers
Bologna F.C. 1909 players
S.S.C. Bari players
Atlético Junior footballers
FC Porto players
Real Zaragoza players
FC Lugano players
Millonarios F.C. players
Hungarian expatriate footballers
Hungarian expatriate sportspeople in Colombia
Expatriate footballers in Italy
Expatriate footballers in Colombia
Expatriate footballers in Portugal
Expatriate footballers in Spain
Expatriate footballers in Switzerland
Hungarian football managers
FC Lugano managers
FC Basel managers
Alemannia Aachen managers
Footballers from Budapest